Murray Coell (born 1955 or 1954) is a Canadian politician. He is a former member of the British Columbia Legislative Assembly, representing the riding of Saanich North and the Islands, a suburb of Victoria, from 1996 through 2012. He is a BC Liberal. He previously served as the  Minister of Environment, Minister of Labour, Minister of Advanced Education and Labour Market Development; Minister of Human Resources; Minister of Community, Aboriginal and Women's Services; and Minister of Advanced Education and Minister Responsible for Research and Technology.

Coell was first elected to the British Columbia legislature in 1996 and has been re-elected in 2001, 2005, and 2009. He announced in 2012 that he would not run for re-election.

Prior to being elected to provincial office, Coell was mayor of Saanich, British Columbia for six years. He has also served as chair of the Capital Regional District. Before entering politics, Coell was a social worker and a small business owner. He has a Bachelor of Arts in social welfare from the University of Victoria.

Election results

References

Year of birth missing (living people)
Living people
Members of the Executive Council of British Columbia
British Columbia Liberal Party MLAs
Mayors of places in British Columbia
People from the Capital Regional District
21st-century Canadian politicians